Serbian salad ( / Srpska salata) is a vegetable salad, usually served during summer with roast meat and other dishes. It is made from diced fresh tomatoes, cucumber and onions, usually seasoned with sunflower oil or olive oil, salt and commonly with a variety of hot pepper similar to cayenne pepper and called feferon. It is similar to the traditional salads of other Balkan countries and the Eastern Mediterranean, such as Shopska salad, Greek salad, Arab salad, Israeli salad and Turkish shepherd's salad.

See also
List of salads

References

Salads
Serbian cuisine